Sporle railway station was located on the line between  and . It opened with the line in 1847 and was temporarily the terminus of the line from Swaffham while building works were being completed towards Dereham (the next section of the line opening the following year). The station served the parish of Sporle with Palgrave and was short-lived - the station closed three years after opening in 1850.

References

Former Great Eastern Railway stations
Railway stations in Great Britain opened in 1847
Railway stations in Great Britain closed in 1850
Disused railway stations in Norfolk
1847 establishments in England
1850 disestablishments in England